Moorhead is a surname. Notable people with the surname include:

Agnes Moorehead (1900–1974), American actress
Bob Moorhead (1938–1986), American baseball player
Carlos Moorhead (1922–2011), American politician
Don Moorhead (born 1948), American football player
Ethel Moorhead (1869–1955), British suffragette and painter
Evan Moorhead (born 1978), Australian politician
Frederick Moorhead (1863–1902), Australian politician and judge
George Moorhead (1895–1976), Northern Ireland footballer
James K. Moorhead (1806–1884), American politician
Jean Moorhead, American actress and model
Joe Moorhead, American football player and coach
John Moorhead, Australian historian and academic
Lorna Jean Moorhead, American writer
Natalie Moorhead (1901–1992), American actress
Scipio Moorhead, American artist
William Moorhead (1882–1962), Canadian Anglican bishop
William S. Moorhead (1923–1987), American politician